Enzo Cornelisse (born 29 June 2002) is a Dutch professional footballer who plays as a defender for Vitesse.

Personal life
Cornelisse is the son of Tim Cornelisse, and the nephew of Yuri Cornelisse who were both professional footballers.

References

External links

 Career stats & Profile - Voetbal International

2002 births
Living people
Footballers from Arnhem
Dutch footballers
Association football defenders
SBV Vitesse players
Eredivisie players